Louis Otto Kunkel (May 7, 1884 – March 20, 1960) was an American botanist and plant pathologist who led the Division of Plant Pathology of the Rockefeller Institute for over two decades beginning in 1932. He was known for his work  on viral diseases of potatoes, cabbage and other crops. 

Born near Mexico, Missouri, he attended the University of Missouri, earning the degrees of B.S. (1903), A.B (1910) and M.A. (1911). He earned a PhD in 1914 from Columbia University, working with Robert A. Harper. He was elected into the National Academy of Sciences in 1932.

References

External links

1884 births
1960 deaths
American botanists
American phytopathologists
People from Mexico, Missouri
University of Missouri alumni
Columbia University alumni
Members of the United States National Academy of Sciences